Newman O'Neal was the mayor of Hobson City, Alabama, until he faced death threats and was assaulted forcing him to flee.

Hobson City

To prevent a large population of Black voters from swaying the election of Oxford, Alabama, Mayor Whitehead of Oxford went to the state capitol and had the corporate boundaries of Oxford redrawn to exclude what is now Hobson City. The town was incorporated on August 16, 1899. Records from a contemporary Alabama newspaper, The Peoples' Journal, described the municipality as "the only municipality controlled and governed entirely by colored people anywhere in the United States." The newspaper further commented: "The whole country will doubtless be interested in the result of this experiment." Under the leadership of the first mayor, S. L. Davis, and the first police chief, James Duran, police protection was restored to the area. The town was named after Richmond P. Hobson, a white naval hero in the then-recent Spanish-American War and member of Congress.

Death Threats
In the summer of 1919, the mayor of Hobson City, Alabama, was Newman O'Neal. He served his community until he received death threats in the form of a "black hand letter surmounted by a skull and crossbones." He ignored the letter but he was assaulted by unknown aggressors and seriously injured forcing him north into exile in late July 1919.  The acting Mayor J. D. Kirksey also received an unsigned death threat letter.  Author Cameron McWhirter says this was a typical tactic of the Ku Klux Klan.

Aftermath

This uprising was one of several incidents of civil unrest that began in the so-called American Red Summer, of 1919. The Summer consisted of terrorist attacks on black communities, and white oppression in over three dozen cities and counties. In most cases, white mobs attacked African American neighborhoods. In some cases, black community groups resisted the attacks, especially in Chicago and Washington, D.C. Most deaths occurred in rural areas during events like the Elaine Race Riot in Arkansas, where an estimated 100 to 240 black people and 5 white people were killed. Also occurring in 1919 were the Chicago Race Riot and Washington D.C. race riot which killed 38 and 39 people respectively, and with both having many more non-fatal injuries and extensive property damage reaching up into the millions of dollars.

See also
Washington race riot of 1919
Mass racial violence in the United States
List of incidents of civil unrest in the United States

Bibliography 
Notes

References   

 - Total pages: 277

 - Total pages: 368
   

1919 in Alabama
July 1919 events
African-American history between emancipation and the civil rights movement
History of racism in Alabama
Racially motivated violence against African Americans
Red Summer
Riots and civil disorder in Alabama
Year of birth missing
Year of death missing